Pi Nu Epsilon is an honor society for university students in musical performing arts organizations.

Purpose 
The purpose of Pi Nu Epsilon is threefold:

 To honor those outstanding men and women who have devoted their time and efforts to the musical organizations at the institutions of the respective chapters.
 To stimulate interest in and to further the aims of the musical organizations at the institutions of the respective chapters.
 To foster and develop a broader interest in music and musical affairs.

History 
Pi Nu Epsilon was founded at Armour Institute of Technology in January 1927 for the purpose of "giving recognition to those men and women who had unselfishly devoted their time and energies to the furtherance of good music".  Only the second non-engineering honor society at Armor Tech, Pi Nu Epsilon was founded by four members of the class of 1927, four members of the class of 1928, and Professor Emeritus Charles Wilbur Leigh. The undergraduate Founders were:

From the beginning, the Society, with its focus on non-Music majors (even for a music-themed society) operated as a recognition society and service organization: it had a strong service component, "in the furtherance of good music" (History).  

Pi Nu Epsilon aided the musical organizations at the Alpha chapter by sponsoring and promoting the musical activities on campus. It thrived for many years under the guidance of Dr. O. Gordon Erickson, who served as Music Director at Armour Institute of Technology from 1932 until his death in August 1953. In 1940, Armour Institute of Technology and Lewis Institute merged to form the Illinois Institute of Technology.

Pi Nu Epsilon was formally incorporated as a nonprofit organization in the state of Illinois on May 16, 1947, by DeWitt H. Pickens, John G. Seeger Jr., Hans H. Nord, and James W. Leichti. Later that month, on May 28, 1947, the Beta chapter was founded at Drexel Institute of Technology. Gamma chapter (later renamed Epsilon) was founded on April 30, 1955 at Ursinus College. Delta chapter was founded on May 12, 1956, at Shippensburg University. Finally, Zeta chapter was founded on April 15, 1989, at Millersville University in Millersville, PA.

Slow expansion has continued, with the recent installation of Eta chapter at Thiel College.

Pi Nu Epsilon today continues with efforts on its campuses to promote campus music organizations.  It draws a majority of members from bands, choirs and ensembles.  The society provide ushering at university performances, caroling at nursing homes, volunteer at local parades, fundraise for non-profit student radio stations and several chapters sponsor a "Battle of the Bands" competition.

Chapters 
According to the national website, these are the chapters of Pi Nu Epsilon. Chapters noted in bold are active, inactive chapters in italics:

References 

1927 establishments in Illinois
Honor societies
Illinois Institute of Technology
Student organizations established in 1927